Real-time gross settlement (RTGS) systems are specialist funds transfer systems where the transfer of money or securities takes place from one bank to any other bank on a "real-time" and on a "gross" basis. Settlement in "real time" means a payment transaction is not subjected to any waiting period, with transactions being settled as soon as they are processed. "Gross settlement" means the transaction is settled on a one-to-one basis, without bundling or netting with any other transaction. "Settlement" means that once processed, payments are final and irrevocable.

History
As of 1985, three central banks implemented RTGS systems, while by the end of 2005, RTGS systems had been implemented by 90 central banks.

The first system that had the attributes of an RTGS system was the US Fedwire system which was launched in 1970.  This was based on a previous method of transferring funds electronically between US federal reserve banks via telegraph.  The United Kingdom and France both independently developed RTGS type systems in 1984.  The UK system was developed by the Bankers' Clearing House in February 1984 and was called CHAPS.  The French system was called SAGITTAIRE.  A number of other developed countries launched systems over the next few years.  These systems were diverse in operation and technology, being country-specific as they were usually based upon previous processes and procedures used in each country.

In the 1990s international finance organizations emphasized the importance of large-value funds transfer systems which banks use to settle interbank transfers for their own account as well as for their customers as a key part of a country's financial infrastructure.  By 1997 a number of countries, inside as well as outside the Group of Ten, had introduced real-time gross settlement systems for large-value funds transfers. Nearly all G-10 countries had plans to have RTGS systems in operation in the course of 1997 and many other countries were also considering introducing such systems.

Operation
RTGS systems are usually operated by a country's central bank as it is seen as critical infrastructure for a country's economy. Economists believe that an efficient national payment system reduces the cost of exchanging goods and services, and is indispensable to the functioning of the interbank, money, and capital markets. A weak payment system may severely drag on the stability and developmental capacity of a national economy; its failures can result in inefficient use of financial resources, inequitable risk-sharing among agents, actual losses for participants, and loss of confidence in the financial system and in the very use of money.

RTGS system does not require any physical exchange of money; the central bank makes adjustments in the electronic accounts of Bank A and Bank B, reducing the balance in Bank A’s account by the amount in question and increasing the balance of Bank B’s account by the same amount. The RTGS system is suited for low-volume, high-value transactions. It lowers settlement risk, besides giving an accurate picture of an institution’s account at any point in time. The objective of RTGS systems by central banks throughout the world is to minimize risk in high-value electronic payment settlement systems. In an RTGS system, transactions are settled across accounts held at a central bank on a continuous gross basis. The settlement is immediate, final, and irrevocable. Credit risks due to settlement lags are eliminated. The best RTGS national payment systems cover up to 95% of high-value transactions within the national monetary market.

RTGS systems are an alternative to systems of settling transactions at the end of the day, also known as the net settlement system, such as the BACS system in the United Kingdom. In a net settlement system, all the inter-institution transactions during the day are accumulated, and at the end of the day, the central bank adjusts the accounts of the institutions by the net amounts of these transactions.

The World Bank has been paying increasing attention to payment system development as a key component of the financial infrastructure of a country and has provided various forms of assistance to over 100 countries. Most of the RTGS systems in place are secure and have been designed around international standards and best practices.

There are several reasons for central banks to adopt RTGS. First, a decision to adopt is influenced by competitive pressure from the global financial markets. Second, it is more beneficial to adopt an RTGS system for the central bank when this allows access to a broad system of other countries' RTGS systems. Third, it is very likely that the knowledge acquired through experiences with RTGS systems spills over to other central banks and helps them make their adoption decision. Fourth, central banks do not necessarily have to install and develop RTGS themselves. The possibility of sharing development with providers that have built RTGS systems in more than one country (CGI of UK holding the IP, CMA Small System of Sweden, JV Perago of South Africa, SIA S.p.A. of Italy and Montran of USA) has presumably lowered the cost and hence made it feasible for many countries to adopt.

Existing systems 

Below is a listing of countries and their RTGS systems:

In 2010, the World Bank published a report on payment systems worldwide, which investigated these countries' usage of real-time gross settlement systems for large-value payments.

See also
 Automated clearing house
 Payment system
 SWIFT

References